Laura J. Padgett (born 1958) is an American artist, working mainly in photography and film.

Early life and education 
Laura J. Padgett was born in Cambridge, Massachusetts. The artist studied painting at Pratt Institute of Art and Design in Brooklyn, New York from 1976-1980, receiving her BFA in 1980. Since 1981 she has been living in Europe. Padgett went on to study Photography and Film with Peter Kubelka and Herbert Schwöbel at the Städelschule in Frankfurt am Main, receiving her Master's in Art History from Frankfurt Goethe-Universität in 1994.

Career 
Since 1992, the artist has also taught at many higher education institutions in Germany, USA and Jordan, including the Bauhaus-Universität in Weimar, Hochschule für Gestaltung, Offenbach, Paderborn University, Drexel University and the Hochschule-Rhein-Main in Wiesbaden. She is currently teaching in the Theater, Film and Media Studies Department at the Goethe-University in Frankfurt am Main.  In November 2021 she became a member of the German Photographic Society (Deutsche Gesellschaft für Photographie e.V). She lives and works in Frankfurt am Main.

Padgett’s medium is photography and film. Her artistic oeuvre often features urban landscapes and interiors, with a concentration on transient spaces created by humans and objects that remain as traces of everyday culture. In her photographic work the artist also composes single photographs into diptychs, triptychs or series. Text is introduced selectively to create correlations and as a deepening of the narrative. While at times Padgett emphasizes details and some images  relate to classic still life, other works concentrate their focus on architectural elements in specific relationships. Both share the visualization of structures and layers that bring to light the correlations behind the surfaces of the obvious. Padgett uses a wide range of techniques, from classic black & white and color film to digital photography and augmented reality. Since 2018 she is represented by the Gallery-Peter-Sillem.

Since 1991, Laura J. Padgett’s work has been featured in numerous solo and group exhibitions in Germany and throughout Europe. Her photography has also been widely published. The artist's photographs accompany the essays by Peter Zumthor in Thinking Architecture (2006/2010/2012). Between 2010 and 2012 Padgett followed the new construction and renovation of the Städel Museum resulting in the publication "Raum über Zeit – Space over Time" (2012). During this period of two years she created photographic narratives that capture time as the space in between. A selection of the photographs from the book are now in the collection of the DZ BANK Kunststiftung.  "Confined Space" was published in 2016, showcasing photographs she made in Lebanon during times she spent there from 2011 to 2015. Her first publication with the Galerie-Peter-Sillem "Open Equations" appeared in 2019. Padgett's second solo exhibit with the Galerie-Peter-Sillem "Regenerating Permanence"  is also accompanied by a limited edition publication of the same name. The work in this exhibition is a culmination of two years' photographing the Westend Synagogue in Frankfurt am Main. Padgett has recorded the special nature of this sanctuary and its history. Five photographs from her series have been acquired by the Jewish Museum Frankfurt and a selection has also been presented in the cloisters of the Frankfurt Dommuseum as part of a larger exhibition celebrating the work of Hans Leistikow.

Padgett’s films have been screened internationally at venues like the Media City Film Festival, Detroit, Cité Paris, House of World Cultures, Berlin, Pharos Centre for Contemporary Art in Nicosia, the Centre Georges Pompidou in Paris, Mousonturm in Frankfurt am Main, Cineteca di Bologna, Künstlerhaus Kino in Vienna, Viper Filmfestival in Bern, Kunsthalle Erfurt and at the International Short Film Festival Oberhausen. In 2017 she received the Marielies-Hess Art Award. In the accompanying exhibition at the Museum Giersch of the Goethe University, she also screened her film SOLITAIRE (2017). A small selection of her films was presented at the San Francisco Cinematheque's CROSSROADS Film Festival, 21. August - 30. September 2020, curated by Steve Polta. In August 2021 her Film "So, tell me about your garden" and a selection of her films from her "From the Garden" series were screened at the Deutsches Filminstitut Filmmuseum as part of the Experimental Film program "Im Garten".

Solo exhibitions (selection) 
 2022 Regenerating Permanence, Galerie-Peter-Sillem, Frankfurt am Main
 2019 Open Equations, Galerie-Peter-Sillem, Frankfurt am Main
 2017 Somehow Real, Exhibition in conjunction with receiving the Marielies-Hess Kunstpreis , Museum Giersch der Goethe-Universität, Frankfurt am Main
 2016 Confined Space, Galerie Rautenstrauch in Onomato Künstlerverein, Düsseldorf
 2016 Many Told Tales, Galerie Straihammer & Seidenschwann, Vienna
 2015 Confined Space, Heussenstamm-Stiftung, Frankfurt am Main
 2014 MONUMENT, Künstlerfahnenfestival, Eppingen
 2012 Standardeinstellung,  
 2011 frames of reference, Galerie Martina Detterer, Frankfurt 
 2008 seeing things, Pharos Arts Foundation, Nicosia, Cyprus
 2008 Holding onto things, Galerie Seitz & Partner, Berlin
 2006 slow motion, Odakule Art Gallery, Istanbul
 2005 inside-out, Galerie Seitz & Partner, Berlin
 2004 vorübergehende Ortschaften, Galerie Martina Detterer, Frankfurt am Main
 2003 conversation pieces, Städel Museum, Frankfurt am Main
 2003 improbabilities, Galerie Seitz & Partner, Berlin
 2001 morning glories, AusstellungsHalle Schulstrasse 1A, Frankfurt am Main
 1999 common occurrences, KunstRaum Klaus Hinrichs, Trier
 1999 marginalia, Goethe-Institut, Warsaw
 1999 an enlightened Moment, Duchess Anna Amalia Library, Weimar
 1998 systematic renewal, dirty windows, Berlin
 1997 Foto / Text Work, KunstRaum Klaus Hinrichs, Trier

Bibliography 
 Laura J. Padgett: Regenerating Permanence, published in conjunction with a solo exhibition in the Galerie-Peter-Sillem 15.01.-26.02.2022
 Laura J. Padgett: Open Equations, Self published in conjunction with the exhibition of the same name at the Gallery Peter Sillem, Design Very , published with the support of the Frankfurt Culture Office
 Laura J. Padgett: Confined Space, Anja Katharina Rautenstrauch, Galerie Rautenstrauch und Anke Ehle-Barthel, Hrg. Bücher & Hefte Verlag, Leipzig. 
 MADE FOR AROLSEN – Reise nach Arglosen, Bad Arolsen, 2016, Birgit Kümmel and Eva Claudia Scholtz, Hrg. 
 Laura  J. Padgett: Raum über Zeit, Heidelberg/Berlin: Kehrer, 2012. 
 Peter Zumthor: Thinking Architecture Third Edition Thinking Architecture: Third, expanded edition With photographs of Haus Zumthor by Laura J. Padgett 
 Wie gemalt: Malerei ohne Malerei (Picture Perfect)Kunstmuseum Ahlen Ausstellung Publikationen - Kataloge und Werkbücher, Kai Uwe Schierz, Ed. produced by Kerber Verlag, Bielefeld
 Laura Padgett: Seeing Things, Nicosia: Pharos Foundation, 2008. 
 Listen in Portikus, Portikus, Frankfurt am Main, 1992 Listen im Portikus - Portikus Frankfurt

Awards and scholarships 
 2022 Neustart Kultur, Working Grant in Digitization_ Module D – BKM, NEUSTART KULTUR und den Deutschen Künstlerbund 
 2017 Marielies-Hess Kunstpreis
 2013 Artists' Contacts, Lebanon, Institute for Foreign Relations (ifa), Stuttgart 
 2008 Photography Residency, Dover Arts Development, Dover, England
 2004 Artists in Residence in Burgdorf, Switzerland from the Frankfurt Cultural Office
 2001–2002 Studio Residency in London from the Hessian Cultural Foundation
 1996–97 Studio Residency at Künstlerhaus Schloss Balmoral, Bad Ems
 1978 Ford Foundation Grant in Painting

References

External links 
 

American women artists
German women artists
1958 births
Living people
People from Cambridge, Massachusetts
21st-century American women